Bazarov is a Russian surname. It derives from the word bazar of Persian origin meaning "marketplace". The feminine form is Bazarova.

Transliterations and variants in other languages include Bazarow, Bazaroff (Germanized), Bazarau (Belarusian), Bazariv (Ukrainian).

Bazarov may refer to:

Aleksey Bazarov (b. 1963), a retired Israeli athlete who specialized in the 400 metres
Boris Bazarov (1893–1939), a Soviet secret police officer
Farkhat Bazarov (b. 1980), a Russian professional football player
Nadezhda Bazarova, a Russian ballerina and ballet teacher
Vera Bazarova (b. 1993), a Russian pair skater
Vladimir Bazarov (1874–1939), a Russian journalist and economist

Fictional characters
Basil Bazarov, from the Tintin comic-strip novel The Broken Ear
Yevgeny Bazarov, from the Turgenev novel Fathers and Sons

Russian-language surnames